Bunin is a Russian male surname, its feminine counterpart is Bunina. It may refer to

Ivan Bunin (1870–1953), Russian writer
Keith Bunin (born c. 1971), American dramatist and screenwriter
Lou Bunin (1904–1994)), American puppeteer, artist, and pioneer of stop-motion animation
Michael Bunin (born 1970), American actor
Revol Bunin (1924–1976), Russian composer
Stanislav Bunin (born 1966), Russian-born pianist
Steve Bunin, American journalist
Anna Bunina (1774–1829), Russian poet

See also
 3890 Bunin, main-belt asteroid

Russian-language surnames